Bragin is a Russian male surname, its feminine counterpart is Bragina. It may refer to

Akhat Bragin (1953–1995), Ukrainian businessman
Dmitry Bragin (born 1982), Russian racing driver
Igor Bragin (born 1965), Russian association football player
Sergei Bragin (born 1967), Estonian association football player
Valeri Bragin (born 1956), Russian ice hockey forward
Lyudmila Bragina (born 1943), Russian Olympic runner

Other 

 Bragin (meteorite)
Bragin (town)
Bragin District